The Southern Giants Brigades, transliterated as Al Amalikah or Al Amaliqah, or simply known as the Giants Brigades, is a pro-government Yemeni militia. Its fighters are mostly South Yemeni tribesmen from Lahej, Abyan and Dhale. They include Salafi students of Muqbil bin Hadi al-Wadi'i's Dar al-hadith religious institute in Dammaj, Saada that were expelled by the Houthis in early 2014. The militia is part of the Yemeni Joint Forces and is the largest faction in the formation. The Giants Brigades also receives extensive support from the United Arab Emirates militarily and financially.

History
The brigades were originally in the former North Yemeni military since the early 1970s. After Yemen unified, these brigades saw intensive action in the 1994 civil war and continued to be an effective unit in the Yemeni military. The original Giants Forces are no longer officially present and have been broken up and distributed in different areas over the years. The current Giants Brigades are a relatively new force in Yemen. They emerged from the Southern Resistance that fought the Houthis in the South at the beginning of the conflict in 2015. They have shown their military power during the Al Hudaydah governarate offensive, where they have killed hundreds of Houthi militants.

In May 2018 the militia alongside Arab coalition forces took control of several pockets in Taiz from the Houthis, in the fighting several Houthi fighters were killed and several pieces of their equipment were either damaged or destroyed. After taking control of the "Mocha Interception" in the city the militia alongside allied forces including other factions in the Joint Forces, the Tihamah Resistance and Yemeni National Resistance they began to advance towards the "Bara Junction" to cut the Houthis' supply lines.

Although many members of the Giants Brigades are known to be Salafists, most of them are first and foremost southerners,.

In December 2021, the Giants announced it had sent troops to Shabwa province "to liberate areas that fell into Huthi hands", driving out the rebels in just two weeks. They also seized southern areas of neighbouring Marib province, where the rebels and loyalists have been engaged in a months-long battles to seize its strategic capital city. After completing military operation Storm of the South the Southern Giants announced the redeployment of its forces after having "completed its mission" and that its troops remain on the frontlines ready to repel any Huthi attacks.

On 7 April 2022, the Yemeni President Abed Rabbo Mansour Hadi issued an order dismissing Vice President Ali Mohsen al-Ahmar and delegating his powers to a newly formed presidential council to lead the country through a transitional period. The leader of the Giants Abdulrahman Abu Zara’a Al Muharrami is a member of this leadership council.

References

Paramilitary organizations based in Yemen
Organizations of the Yemeni Crisis (2011–present)
Yemeni Civil War (2014–present)
Resistance movements